Ahmad Abbas Hattab Al-Saedi (born May 9, 1994) is an Iraqi footballer who plays as a center midfielder for Al-Talaba in Iraq Premier League.

International Debut
On January 12, 2013 Hattab made his International debut against Yemen in the 21st Arabian Gulf Cups.

Honors

International
Iraq Youth team
 2012 AFC U-19 Championship: runner-up
Iraq National football team
 21st Arabian Gulf Cup: runner-up

International statistics

Iraq national under-20 team goals
Goals are correct excluding friendly matches and unrecognized tournaments such as Arab U-20 Championship.

Iraq national under-23 team goals
Goals are correct excluding friendly matches.

References

External links
profile on goalzz.com

1993 births
Living people
Association football midfielders
Al-Mina'a SC players
Iraqi footballers
Al-Shorta SC players
Iraq youth international footballers
Iraq international footballers